The 2009–10 Primera División de México season is the 63rd professional season of Mexico's top-flight football league, and 13th season in which the Apertura and Clausura system is used. The season is split into two tournaments—the Torneo Apertura and the Torneo Bicentenario—each with identical formats and each contested by the same eighteen teams.

Clubs

Seventeen teams returned for this season. Necaxa was relegated the previous season after accumulating the lowest coefficient over the past three seasons. They were replaced by Querétaro, who was promoted from the Liga de Ascenso.

Managerial changes

Torneo Apertura
The 2009 Torneo Apertura was the first tournament of the season. The tournament began on July 24 and ended on December 13. Defending champion UNAM failed to defend their title after missing the playoffs. On December 13, 2009, Monterrey defeated Cruz Azul 6–4 in aggregate score to win their third title. Cruz Azul forward Emanuel Villa won his first golden boot after scoring 17 goals, five more than Héctor Mancilla who won it the two previous tournaments.

Regular season

League table

Group standings

Results

Playoffs

 If the two teams are tied after both legs, the higher seeded team advances.
 Both finalist qualify to the 2010–11 CONCACAF Champions League. The champion qualifies directly to the Group Stage, while the runner-up qualifies to the Preliminary Round.

Top goalscorers

Updated to November 22, 2009Source: FeMexFut

Awards
The awards for this tournament were given out in Mexico City on January 17, 2010.
Non-voting awards
Super-leader: Toluca
Champion: Monterrey
Top-scorer: Emanuel Villa (Cruz Azul)
Best physical trainer: Miguel Ángel Ramírez (Monterrey)
Fair play: UNAM
Balón de Oro
Best manager: Víctor Manuel Vucetich (Monterrey)
Best goalkeeper: Jonathan Orozco (Monterrey)
Best wingback: Rogelio Chávez (Cruz Azul)
Best centre-back: Duilio Davino (Monterrey)
Best defensive midfielder: Gerardo Torrado (Cruz Azul)
Best offensive midfielder: Jaime Lozano (Cruz Azul)
Best striker: Emanuel Villa (Cruz Azul)
Best rookie: Raúl Nava (Toluca)
Best player: Humberto Suazo (Monterrey)
Best referee: Armando Archundia
Best assistant referee: José Luis Camargo

Torneo Bicentenario
The 2010 Torneo Bicentenario is the second tournament of the season. The tournament began on January 16 and ended on May 15. The tournament got its name (the Bicentennial tournament) to commemorate the bicentennial anniversary of the Mexican independence.

Regular season

Points Standings

Group standings

Results

Playoff Stage

 If the two teams are tied after both legs, the higher seeded team advances.
 Both finalist qualify to the 2010–11 CONCACAF Champions League. The champion qualifies directly to the Group Stage, while the runner-up qualifies to the Preliminary Round.

Top goalscorers

Updated to April 25, 2010Source: FeMexFut

Relegation

Updated as of games played on April 25, 2010.Source: FeMexFut

References

External links
FeMexFut's official website

 

 
2009–10 domestic association football leagues
1
2009